Charles Davis (born November 26, 1980) is an American former professional boxer. He won the vacant WBC Latino Heavyweight title in 2004. In 2005 he won the WBC Continental Americas Cruiserweight title, defeating  Gary Gomez via unanimous decision in a 10-round bout. He lost the title one year later, at the first defense.

Professional career
In 2004, he went to fight Arthur Williams with a record of 7-8-1. He defeated Williams via points decision after 10 rounds, going into a winning streak of 10 wins, that by December 2005 brought his record to 17-8-1.

On July 21, 2005 he beat Gary Gomez, winning the WBC Continental Americas cruiserweight title. He lost the title to Danny Batchelder on February 23, 2006. He lost to Batchelder via points decision, with scores of 96-94 (twice) and 97-93.

He was set to fight future WBC heavyweight champion Bermane Stiverne on April 29, 2009 in St. Louis, Missouri, at the Scottrade Center. The bout resulted in a draw. On January 22, 2011 he scored a draw against Monte Barrett.

His last bout, in which he fought Travis Kauffman, was stopped due to rain in the 7th round. Kauffman was awarded a points decision win.

Professional boxing record

References

External links
 

Living people
1980 births
American male boxers
Cruiserweight boxers
Heavyweight boxers
Southpaw boxers
Boxers from Arizona